Argonaut Sheffield (formerly Particle Systems Ltd.) was a British computer game developer based in Sheffield, England. The company was founded as Particle Systems by Glyn Williams and Michael Powell. Games developed by Particle Systems include I-War and its sequel Independence War 2: Edge of Chaos. The company was working on tactical combat game EXO, when it was acquired by Argonaut Games in January 2002 and became Argonaut Sheffield. Under this new guise the company  released Bionicle, Power Drome and submitted a number of demos for Star Wars, Charlie and the Chocolate Factory and Zorro. Argonaut Sheffield was closed in late October 2004 when Argonaut games was put into administration.

Games developed

References

External links
The official Particle Systems' homepage archived by Wayback Machine
Company profile at MobyGames

Defunct companies based in Sheffield
Video game companies established in 1993
Video game companies disestablished in 2004
Defunct video game companies of the United Kingdom
Video game development companies